Ruel Marlon Ricardo Brathwaite (born 6 September 1985) is a Barbadian cricketer. Brathwaite is a right-handed batsman who bowls right-arm fast-medium. He was born in Bridgetown.

Early life and career
Brathwaite was educated at Queen's College in Barbados, before leaving for England when he was 17 to attend Dulwich College. While studying at Dulwich, Brathwaite was spotted by former England Test cricketer Bill Athey. After completing his studies, he moved on to Loughborough University to obtain a degree in civil engineering. Loughborough University was part of the Marylebone Cricket Club's young cricketers program, as such it was designated as a Centre of Cricketing Excellence with first-class status. Under the coaching of Graham Dilley, Brathwaite was selected to play for Loughborough UCCE, making his first-class debut against Essex in 2006. In that same season he was selected to play for the British Universities against the touring Sri Lankans. The following season saw him selected play two first-class matches for the Marylebone Cricket Club, against the touring West Indians and later against Sri Lanka A. During the West Indies 2007 tour of England, Braithwaite was called up to represent the West Indians in a List A match against the England Lions, claiming the wicket of Owais Shah for the cost of 19 runs from three overs. 2008 saw Brathwaite play his final first-class match for Loughborough UCCE against Surrey. In total, he played five first-class matches for Loughborough, scoring 129 runs at an average of 32.25, with a high score of 76 not out. With the ball, he took 7 wickets at an expensive bowling average of 67.85, with best figures of 3/77.

Cambridge University to Durham
Advancing from Loughborough University, he was accepted by Cambridge University to study for his Master of Philosophy in Engineering for Sustainable Development. Cambridge University is also designated as a Centre of Cricketing Excellence, while studying there he made four first-class appearances: three for Cambridge UCCE, and one for Cambridge University Cricket Club against Oxford University Cricket Club in the 2009 University Match at Lord's. In the University Match, Brathwaite claimed his maiden five wicket haul by taking figures of 5/54, helping Cambridge University to an eventual 10 wicket victory.

Following his studies at Cambridge University, Brathwaite was at The Oval bowling in the nets to the England players. His bowling impressed Durham cricketer Paul Collingwood enough for him to contact the Durham Second XI coach Jonathan Lewis, who proceeded to invite Brathwaite to play for Durham for the remaining few weeks of the 2010 season, during which he made a single first-class appearance against Somerset in the County Championship, taking 4 wickets in the match. Following to 2010 season, Brathwaite signed a two-year deal with Durham. Returning to the West Indies following the 2010 English season, he proceeded to make his Twenty20 debut for the Combined Campuses and Colleges against Guyana in the 2010 Caribbean Twenty20. In this match, he claimed the wicket of Christopher Barnwell for the cost of 33 runs from 3 overs, while with the bat he was dismissed for a duck by Lennox Cush.

Returning to Durham for the 2011 season, Brathwaite made his first List A appearance for the county against Scotland in the Clydesdale Bank 40, as well as playing six first-class matches. He has so far taken 26 first-class wickets in 2011, coming at an average of 27.38, with two five-wicket hauls and best figures of 5/56. He has stated his desire not to qualify to potentially play for England, but to return to the West Indies to get into the Barbados team and to play for the West Indies. In 2012, he made just a single appearance for Durham in a first-class match against the touring Australia A team.

References

External links
Ruel Brathwaite at ESPNcricinfo
Ruel Brathwaite at CricketArchive

1985 births
Living people
Cricketers from Bridgetown
People educated at Dulwich College
Alumni of Loughborough University
Alumni of the University of Cambridge
Barbadian cricketers
Loughborough MCCU cricketers
Marylebone Cricket Club cricketers
Cambridge University cricketers
Durham cricketers
Combined Campuses and Colleges cricketers
Hampshire cricketers
British Universities cricketers
Cambridge MCCU cricketers